The Stabilization Plan of 1959 or the National Plan of Economic Stabilization were a series of economic measures taken by the Spanish Government in 1959. Its main goal was the economic liberalization of the Spanish markets, marking a turning point from the previous policies oriented towards achieving autarky.

The implementation of the plan led to mass migration movements (internal migrations but also abroad), with the population and the economic activity concentrating in the most dynamic areas, hollowing the rest of the country.

The Plan led to an economic boom in Spain for most of the 1960s. The monetary reserves of the Bank of Spain increased, inflation dropped from 12.6% in 1958 to 2.4% in 1960, Spain attracted foreign investment, and the relaxation of tariffs led to the import of new technologies. On the negative side, unemployment increased due to the decrease in production caused by higher imports, which lowered the demand for national products. This decrease in production also led to lower consumption and wage freezes.

References

See also
 Francoist Spain
 Economy of Spain
 Economic history of Spain
 1959 in Spain

1959 in Spain
Economic history of Spain
Francoist Spain
Economic planning